Brandon Metcalf (born July 3, 1986) is an American record producer and entrepreneur. In 2005, he founded Destiny Collective, a network of businesses in the music and merchandising industries. He was originally a Seattle-based record producer but as of August 2012 is now based primarily out of Nashville.

History: Teenage years
Starting in the 6th grade, Metcalf was a paperboy. At age 13, he took savings from the paper route job and purchased a set of turntables after deciding he wanted to be a DJ. Adopting the nickname FADE, he spent his teenage years DJing at competitions, school dances, clubs, and weddings. He started his first official business at age 15 which was a wedding DJ business. At age 13 he wrote and recorded his own hip hop album, using beats he made on the computer and sampled from vinyl records. At age 16, he upgraded to Pro Tools software and recorded local acoustic projects out of his parents home.

Destiny Collective
At age 19, Brandon sold the DJ company, dropped out of Brigham Young University, and purchased a home to build a studio in. He started a new company called Destiny Collective to focus on artist development, record production, and merchandising. The parent corporation includes successful ventures shirtsforgreeks.com, specializing in collegiate and Greek apparel, and the newly launched Destiny Nashville, a recording studio and production company on music row.

Studio work
Brandon has worked in the studio as a producer, engineer, and/or mixer with bands and artists such as:
Jewel
Blues Traveler
Secondhand Serenade
Due West 
The Classic Crime
Julia Sheer 
Elenowen 
Trent Dabbs 
Brooke Waggoner 
Veronica Ballestrini
Brooke Hogan
Stephen Jerzak
Daphne Loves Derby
The Real You
The Scene Aesthetic
He Is We
Danger Radio
A Change of Pace
Common Market
Anarbor
Artist vs Poet

Aside from his personal studio, he has worked on projects in studios throughout Seattle, Los Angeles, and Nashville. His production work has received positive reviews from music publications and websites such as absolutepunk.net.

Recognition
Brandon and his work has been featured on: 
MTV
VH1
e!
USA
ABC
NBC
Rolling Stone

In addition, he has been featured in interviews in The Wall Street Journal, The New York Times, The Seattle Times, FOX, and ABC News.

References

External links 
 

1986 births
Living people
Record producers from Washington (state)
Record producers from Tennessee